Henryk Jasiczek (2 March 1919 – 8 December 1976) was a Polish journalist, poet, writer, and activist from the Zaolzie region. He is considered one of the most important Polish writers from Zaolzie after World War II and one of the most popular local Polish poets.

Jasiczek was born in Kottingbrunn near Vienna, Austria as an extramarital child. He spent his childhood in Oldrzychowice near Trzyniec. Since 1934 he studied horticulture in Trzyniec, where, as later remembered, witnessed the worst forms of labour exploitation of workers. In 1936 defended one apprentice who had been beaten by the supervisor and bashed the supervisor himself. In consequence he left and finished horticultural studies in Chrudim, only to work later for a gardener in Hradečno. In 1938 he came back to Zaolzie but wasn't able to find a job. Since March 1939 Jasiczek worked in the Třinec Iron and Steel Works as a worker.

During World War II he was engaged in Polish leftist resistance, where he worked in the underground press and distributed illegal press under the pseudonym of Wiktor Raban. After the war he joined the Communist Party of Czechoslovakia and became editor-in-chief of Głos Ludu newspaper. He remained in this position until 1957. Jasiczek graduated from a journalism department of the Charles' University in Prague in 1960. He contributed to Polish children magazines and to Zwrot, a Polish cultural and literary magazine. Jasiczek was also an active member of the Polish Cultural and Educational Union, where he directed its Literary-Artistic Section (SLA) from 1945 to 1968.

During the Prague Spring, Jasiczek firmly supported the reformist wing of the Communist Party. His stances and their public manifestations led to his expulsion from public life in May 1970. He was not permitted to publish anymore. Jasiczek spent the last years of his life in seclusion and was forced to work in the printing works as a proofreader with half of the usual salary. He died on 8 December 1976 in a hospital in Český Těšín (Czeski Cieszyn). Communist authorities did not even allow his obituary to be printed. Henryk Jasiczek was exonerated in 1990.

Right after World War II his poetry focused on social issues. Eventually Jasiczek concentrated on folk and natural motives of regional nature. His lyric poetry is full of melancholy and appreciation of the natural beauties of his region, mostly the Beskids mountain ranges.

Jasiczek's adoration of natural beauties of his region, particularly the Beskids can be seen for example in Nie zdradzę (I Will not Betray) poem from Obuszkiem ciosane (Cut with Cudgel) poetry collection.

Works 
 Rozmowy z ciszą (1948) - poetry collection
 Pochwała życia (1952)
 Gwiazdy nad Beskidem (1953) - poetry collection
 Obuszkiem ciosane (1955) - poetry collection
 Jaśminowe noce (1959) - poetry collection
 Humoreski beskidzkie (1959) - prose
 Poetyckie pozdrowienia (1961) - poetry collection
 Morze Czarne jest błękitne (1961) - travel report
 Krásné jak housle (1962)
 Blizny pamięci (1963)
 Przywiozę ci krokodyla (1965) - travel report
 Pokus o smír (1967)
 Baj, baju z mojego kraju (1968) - poetry collection for children
 Zamyślenie (1969)
 Smuga cienia (1981) - posthumous selection of poetry
 Jak ten obłok (1990) - posthumous selection of poetry
 Wiersze (2006) - posthumous selection of poetry

Footnotes

References 
 

 

 

 

 
 

 

 
 
 
 
 

1919 births
1976 deaths
Polish male poets
Polish people from Zaolzie
Polish communists
Charles University alumni
World War II resistance press activists
Communist Party of Czechoslovakia members
20th-century Polish poets
Recipients of the Order of Polonia Restituta
20th-century Polish journalists